Latfiana-Aris Budiharto (born 31 August 1990) is an Indonesian professional tennis player. She made her debut as a professional in 2004, at the age of 14, at an  ITF tournament in Jakarta. 

Her first, and as yet only, tournament win came in 2008, when she and partner Beatrice Gumulya won an ITF tournament at Bulungan.

ITF Circuit finals

Doubles (1–1)

External links
 
 

Indonesian female tennis players
1990 births
Living people
21st-century Indonesian women